The 1999 Sunderland Council election took place on 6 May 1999 to elect members of Sunderland Metropolitan Borough Council in Tyne and Wear, England. One third of the council was up for election and the Labour Party stayed in overall control of the council.

After the election, the composition of the council was:
Labour 64
Conservative 8
Liberal Democrat 2
Liberal 1

Election result
The results saw Labour stay in control, but their leader, Bryn Sidaway, lost his seat after 16 years on the council. Sidaway lost in Hendon ward by 2 votes to Conservative Paul Maddison after 3 recounts, which was one of 4 gains made by the Conservatives. Labour blamed the defeat of Sidaway on dirty tricks after anonymous posters were displayed associating Sidaway with neo-nazis, but this was denied by the Conservatives. Overall turnout was 20%, but was as low as 12.4% in Central ward.

Following the election Colin Anderson was elected as the new leader of the Labour group and the council.

References

1999 English local elections
1999
20th century in Tyne and Wear